Gampola East Grama Niladhari Division is a Grama Niladhari Division of the Udapalatha Divisional Secretariat of Kandy District of Central Province, Sri Lanka. It has Grama Niladhari Division Code 1108.

Gampola are located within, nearby or associated with Gampola East.

Gampola East is a surrounded by the Bothalapitiya, Illawathura, Polkumbura, Unambuwa, Ilangawatta, Kahatapitiya and Ilangawatta Grama Niladhari Divisions.

Demographics

Ethnicity 

The Gampola East Grama Niladhari Division has a Moor majority (86.9%). In comparison, the Udapalatha Divisional Secretariat (which contains the Gampola East Grama Niladhari Division) has a Sinhalese majority (55.9%), a significant Moor population (22.0%) and a significant Indian Tamil population (13.5%)

Religion 

The Gampola East Grama Niladhari Division has a Muslim majority (87.6%). In comparison, the Udapalatha Divisional Secretariat (which contains the Gampola East Grama Niladhari Division) has a Buddhist majority (55.0%), a significant Muslim population (22.7%) and a significant Hindu population (19.5%)

Gallery

References 

Grama Niladhari Divisions of Udapalatha Divisional Secretariat